CRRC Tangshan Co., Ltd., is a manufacturer of rolling stock located in Tangshan, Hebei province, People's Republic of China. While Datong built mainline steam locomotives until 1988, Tangshan built steam for industrial use until 1999, becoming the last works in the world to build steam for non-tourist use.

History
The predecessor of the subsidiary, Tangshan Locomotive and Rolling Stock Works was founded before the establishment of the People's Republic of China in 1949. In 2002, LORIC was split into CNR Group and CSR Group, which Tangshan works belonged to the former due to geographical location. CNR Group and CSR Group also belonged to newly established State-owned Assets Supervision and Administration Commission, another department of the State Council.

Due to the initial public offering of China CNR, the assets of the works was injected to a newly incorporated subsidiary, which was known as Tangshan Railway Vehicle Co., Ltd..

In November 2005, CNR Group signed a 669 million euro agreement with Siemens under CEO Klaus Kleinfeld that gave them access to the intellectual property jewels of the latter. The first of these trains were to run in 2008 on the Beijing-Tianjin route. Only the first three of 60 trains were to be built in Germany. The balance were built at the plant which is now named CRRC Tangshan.

Products

Steam locomotives
"Rocket of China", first locomotive built in China (1881)
China Railways SY (from 1958 to 1999)
Two tourist railways in the United States own Tangshan steam locomotives - The New York, Susquehanna and Western Technical and Historical Society (on the Belvidere and Delaware River Railway) and the Valley Railroad

Diesel locomotives
 China Railways DF5

Passenger coaches
25B		
25G		
25K		
25T

Multiple units
 TSD09		
 CRH3, Chinese version of the Siemens Velaro train set		
 Two DMUs using Voith transmissions for suburban use with Ghana Railway Corporation.		
 20 DMU for Bangladesh (2011) 		
 :es:Unidad de tren diésel CNR for Trenes Argentinos
 High-speed freight train

Metro
 Tianjin Metro line 1	
 Fuzhou Metro line 1
 Shijiazhuang Metro line 1
 Xiamen Metro

Intercity commuter rail
 CRHCJ-2
 CRHCJ-3

Regional rail
 Bi-Level cars for RTM in Montreal, Canada

LRV
 Changchun Tram licensed from Siemens Mobility
 Samsun Tram, Turkey
 Trams in İzmir

Maglev
 Line S1 (Beijing Subway) Medium-low Speed Maglev

References

External links 

 

 
CRRC Group